The Women's 200m Butterfly at the 2007 World Aquatics Championships took place on 28 March (prelims & semifinals) and the evening of 29 March (finals) at the Rod Laver Arena in Melbourne, Australia. 57 swimmers were entered in the event, of which 54 swam.

Existing records at the start of the event were:
World Record (WR): 2:05.40, Jessicah Schipper (Australia), 17 August 2006 in Victoria, Canada.
Championship Record (CR): 2:05.61, Otylia Jędrzejczak (Poland), Montreal 2005 (28 July 2005)

Results

Final

Semifinals

Preliminaries

Prelims rankings

Heat 1

Heat 2

Heat 3

Heat 4

Heat 5

Heat 6

Heat 7

Heat 8

See also
 Swimming at the 2005 World Aquatics Championships – Women's 200 metre butterfly
 Swimming at the 2008 Summer Olympics – Women's 200 metre butterfly
 Swimming at the 2009 World Aquatics Championships – Women's 200 metre butterfly

References

Women's 200m Butterfly Preliminary results from the 2007 World Championships. Published by OmegaTiming.com (official timer of the '07 Worlds); Retrieved 2009-07-11.
Women's 200m Butterfly Semifinals results from the 2007 World Championships. Published by OmegaTiming.com (official timer of the '07 Worlds); Retrieved 2009-07-11.
Women's 200m Butterfly Final results from the 2007 World Championships. Published by OmegaTiming.com (official timer of the '07 Worlds); Retrieved 2009-07-11.

Swimming at the 2007 World Aquatics Championships
2007 in women's swimming